International Turkmen-Turkish University (abbreviated as ITTU) was a university located in Ashgabat, Turkmenistan. The University was established in 1994 and closed in 2016, superseded by the Oguzhan University of Engineering Technologies.

History 
The university was established in 1994 in close cooperation with Turkey. On 30 May 2013, a groundbreaking ceremony was held for the new building complex of the Oguzhan University of Engineering Technologies, attended by President Gurbanguly Berdimuhamedov of Turkmenistan and President Abdullah Gul of Turkey. The new campus was constructed in the Köşi neighborhood of Ashgabat with design capacity of 3,500 students.

Colleges 
 Pedagogical
 Engineering
 International Business
 Language Center

Sports 

In 2003, the university formed a football club known as HTTU Aşgabat. Initially composed only of students, it soon became a professional organization. It currently competes as Ýedigen FC and has won three Ýokary Liga titles.

Graduates 
 Berdi Şamyradow –  professional Turkmen football player.

References 

Universities in Turkmenistan
Buildings and structures in Ashgabat
Educational institutions established in 1994
Education in Ashgabat
1994 establishments in Turkmenistan